Bernard Morrison (born 20 May 1994) is a Ghanaian professional footballer who is currently playing for Tanzanian Premier League club Young Africans.

Career statistics

References

1993 births
Living people
Ghanaian footballers
Ghana international footballers
Heart of Lions F.C. players
Ashanti Gold SC players
AS Vita Club players
Orlando Pirates F.C. players
Daring Club Motema Pembe players
Young Africans S.C. players
Simba S.C. players
Ghanaian expatriate footballers
Expatriate footballers in the Democratic Republic of the Congo
Ghanaian expatriate sportspeople in the Democratic Republic of the Congo
Expatriate soccer players in South Africa
Ghanaian expatriate sportspeople in South Africa
Expatriate footballers in Tanzania
Ghanaian expatriate sportspeople in Tanzania
Association football forwards
Tanzanian Premier League players